The 2012 City of Bradford Metropolitan District Council election took place on 3 May 2012. The elections took place shortly after the Bradford West by-election, in which the Respect Party's George Galloway pulled off a shock victory against the incumbent Labour Party. Held alongside was a referendum on directly elected mayors. The Labour Party were one seat short of an overall majority following the election, leaving the council in no overall control.

Election result
Of the council's 90 seats, 30 were up for election.

Ward results
An asterisk denotes an incumbent.

Baildon ward

Bingley ward

Bingley Rural ward

Bolton & Undercliffe ward

Bowling & Barkerend ward

Bradford Moor ward
Faisal Khan resigned from the Respect Party along with four other councillors in October 2013 and served as an independent councillor until March 2015 when he rejoined the party.

City ward
Ruqayyah Collector resigned from the Respect Party along with four other councillors in October 2013 and served as an independent councillor until March 2015 when he rejoined the party.

Clayton & Fairweather Green ward

Craven ward
In 2008, Adrian Naylor stood successfully in this ward as a Conservative Party candidate.

Eccleshill ward

Great Horton ward

Heaton ward
Mohammad Shabbir resigned from the Respect Party along with four other councillors in October 2013. He served as an independent councillor until April 2015 when he joined the Labour Party.

Idle & Thackley ward

Ilkley ward
Anne Hawkesworth left the Conservative Party in January 2013 and joined The Independents: Adrian Naylor (Craven) and Chris Greaves (Wharfedale).

Keighley Central ward

Keighley East ward

Keighley West

Little Horton ward
 Ian Greenwood had been the Bradford City Council leader prior to the election.
 Alyas Karmani resigned from the Respect Party along with four other councillors in October 2013 and served as an independent councillor until March 2015 when he rejoined the party.

Manningham ward
Ishtiaq Ahmed resigned from the Respect Party along with four other councillors in October 2013 and served as an independent councillor until March 2015 when he rejoined the party.

Queensbury ward

Royds ward

Shipley ward

Thornton & Allerton ward

Toller ward
163 (3.66%) ballot papers were rejected, compared to 48 (0.96%) in the 2008 election in this ward. Arshad Hussain stood successfully here as a Conservative Party candidate in 2008, before defecting in 2010 following a race row - his vote change corresponds to the 2008 Labour Party candidate, Sobia Kauser.

Tong ward

Wharfedale ward

Wibsey ward

Windhill & Wrose ward

Worth Valley ward

Wyke ward

Referendum result
Mayoral referendums were held in 11 local authorities across England to decide whether to introduce directly elected mayors, as opposed in Bradford to the previous system of Councillors electing a leader of the council. Alongside Birmingham, Coventry, Leeds, Newcastle upon Tyne, Nottingham, Sheffield and Wakefield, Bradford voted against directly elected mayors. Only Bristol and Doncaster voted in favour.

By-elections between 2012 and 2013 elections
Vote changes correspond to the 2012 Council election.

Wharfedale ward
This was triggered by the resignation of Cllr. Matt Palmer, who had stood successfully for the Conservative Party in this ward in the 2003, 2007 and 2011 council elections, in 
early October.

See also
Bradford local elections

References

2012
Bradford
2010s in West Yorkshire